FC Whangarei is a semi-professional association football club in Whangarei, New Zealand. They are competing in the US1 Premiership.

References
1. UltimateNZSoccer website's FC Whangarei  page

External links
 US1 FC Whangarei page
 FC Whangarei Official website

Association football clubs established in 1950
Association football clubs in New Zealand
1950 establishments in New Zealand